Tihomir Stanić (born 17 November 1960) is a Serbian actor. He appeared in more than eighty films since 1981.

Selected filmography

References

External links
 

1960 births
Living people
Serbian male film actors
Serbian male television actors
20th-century Serbian male actors
21st-century Serbian male actors
People from Dubica, Bosnia and Herzegovina
Serbs of Bosnia and Herzegovina